Andole is a village in Medak district of Indian state of Telangana.

References

Villages in Medak district
Mandal headquarters in Medak district